The 2002 IIHF World U20 Championship, commonly referred as the 2002 World Junior Hockey Championships (2002 WJHC), was the 26th edition of the Ice Hockey World Junior Championship. The tournament was held in Pardubice and Hradec Králové, Czech Republic, from December 25, 2001 to January 4, 2002.

Russia won the gold medal with a 5–4 come-from-behind victory over Canada in the championship game, while Finland won the bronze medal with a 5–1 victory over Switzerland.

Venues

Rosters

Top Division

Preliminary round

Group A

All times local (CET/UTC+1).

Group B

All times local (CET/UTC+1).

Relegation round

 was relegated to Division I for the 2003 World Junior Ice Hockey Championships.

Final round
Source:

<small>† Overtime victory.  ‡ Shootout victory.</small>

Quarterfinals

Consolation round

Semifinals

7th place game

5th place game

Bronze medal game

Gold medal game

Scoring leaders

Goaltending leaders
Minimum 40% of team's ice time.

Tournament awards

Final standings

Division I

The Division I tournament was played in Kapfenberg and Zeltweg, Austria between December 9 and December 15, 2001.

Group A

Group B

Placement round
Source:

Final round
Source: was promoted to the Top Division for the 2003 World Junior Ice Hockey Championships. Due to a restructuring of the tournament, no team was relegated from Division I, which in the 2003 tournament consisted of 12 teams in 2 groups.Division II

The Division II tournament was played in Zagreb, Croatia between December 30, 2001 and January 3, 2002.

Preliminary round
Group A

Group B

Final round
Source:

All times local (CET/UTC+1).

7th place game

5th place game

3rd place game

Due to a restructuring of the tournament, no team was relegated from Division II, which in the 2003 tournament consisted of 12 teams in 2 groups.Division III

The Division III tournament was played in Belgrade, Federal Republic of Yugoslavia between January 5 and January 9, 2002.

Preliminary round
Group A

Group B

Final round
Source:

All times local (EET/UTC+2).

7th place game

5th place game

3rd place game

1st place gameDue to a restructuring of the tournament, all teams were promoted to Division II for the 2003 World Junior Ice Hockey Championships, which consisted of 12 teams in 2 groups.''

References

External links
 Results (Hockey Canada)

 
World Junior Ice Hockey Championships
World Junior Ice Hockey Champsionship
world
2002
Youth ice hockey in the Czech Republic
December 2001 sports events in Europe
January 2002 sports events in Europe
Sports competitions in Pardubice
Sport in Hradec Králové
2001–02 in Austrian ice hockey
International ice hockey competitions hosted by Austria
2001–02 in Croatian ice hockey
Sports competitions in Zagreb
2000s in Zagreb
International sports competitions in Belgrade
2000s in Belgrade
2001–02 in Yugoslav ice hockey
International ice hockey competitions hosted by Yugoslavia
International ice hockey competitions hosted by Croatia